Jan Stefan Gałecki (18 June 1932 in Zalesie, Przasnysz County – 27 April 2021 in Szczecin) was a Polish Roman Catholic titular and auxiliary bishop.

Biography
Gałecki was born in Poland and was ordained to the priesthood in 1957. He served as titular bishop of Maiuca and as auxiliary bishop of the Roman Catholic Archdiocese of Szczecin-Kamień, Poland, from 1974 to 2007.

Notes

1932 births
2021 deaths
Polish Roman Catholic titular bishops
20th-century Roman Catholic bishops in Poland
21st-century Roman Catholic bishops in Poland
People from Przasnysz County
Deaths from the COVID-19 pandemic in Poland